The City of Penrith is a local government area in the state of New South Wales, Australia. It occupies part of the traditional lands of the Darug people. First incorporated as a municipality on 12 May 1871, on 1 January 1949, the municipalities of Penrith, St Marys and Castlereagh and part of the Nepean Shire amalgamated to form a new Municipality of Penrith. Penrith was declared a City on 21 October 1959, and expanded westwards to include Emu Plains and Emu Heights, formerly part of the City of Blue Mountains, on 25 October 1963. As at the  the City of Penrith had an estimated population of 196,066.

The Mayor of the City of Penrith is Cr. Tricia Hitchen, a member of the Liberal Party.

Suburbs and localities in the local government area 
The following suburbs and localities are located within the City of Penrith:

Council history

On 3 March 1890, St Marys was separately incorporated, and on 26 July 1893 and 9 September 1895, Mulgoa and Castlereagh followed respectively. In 1913, Mulgoa became the "A" Riding of the neighbouring Nepean Shire.

On 1 January 1949, under the Local Government (Areas) Act 1948, the Municipalities of Penrith, St Marys and Castlereagh and A Riding of the Nepean Shire amalgamated to form a new Municipality of Penrith. It was declared a City on 21 October 1959, and expanded westwards to include Emu Plains and Emu Heights, formerly part of the City of Blue Mountains, on 25 October 1963.

Demographics 

At the 2016 census, there were 196,066 people in the Penrith local government area, of these 49.4% were male and 50.6% were female. Aboriginal and Torres Strait Islander people made up 3.9% of the population; notably above the national average of 2.8%. The median age of people in the City of Penrith was 34 years; notably below the national median of 38 years. Children aged 0 – 14 years made up 21.06% of the population and people aged 65 years and over made up 11.69% of the population. Of people in the area aged 15 years and over, 47.3% were married and 12.3% were either divorced or separated.

When compared with total population growth of Australia for the same periods, being 5.78% and 8.32% respectively, population growth in the Penrith local government area was significantly lower than the national average. The median weekly income for residents within the City of Penrith was on with par with the national average.

Meanwhile, as at the Census date, compared to the national average, households in the Penrith local government area had a marginally lower than average proportion (20.7%) where two or more languages are spoken (national average was 22.2%); and a higher proportion (77.2%) where English only was spoken at home (national average was 72.7%).

Council

Composition and election methods

Current composition and election method
Penrith City Council is composed of fifteen Councillors elected proportionally as three separate wards, each electing five Councillors. All Councillors are elected for a fixed four-year term of office. The Mayor is elected by the Councillors at the first meeting of the council for a two-year term, while the Deputy Mayor is elected for a single-year term only. The most recent election was held on 10 September 2016, with a by-election held on 12 May 2018 to replace two Councillors who resigned during the Council term. The current Council is as follows:

The current Council, elected in 2016, in order of election by ward, is:

Mayors

Media 
The City of Penrith is served by a weekly newspaper, The Western Weekender, which was founded in 1991. It produces a print edition each Friday as well as a digital news service. The newspaper is independently owned.

Sister cities
Since it signed its first agreement with Fujieda, Japan in 1984, Penrith City has gradually expanded its sister cities and international links programme. Presently Penrith has links with:

 Penrith, Cumbria, England - Sister City
 Fujieda City, Shizuoka Prefecture, Japan - Sister City
 Hakusan City (incorporating Matto City), Ishikawa Prefecture, Japan - Friendship City
 Kunshan, Jiangsu Province, China - Friendship City
 Xicheng District of Beijing City, China - Mutual Co-operation Agreement
 Gangseo-gu, Seoul, Republic of Korea - Mutual Co-operation Agreement

Heritage listings
The City of Penrith has a number of heritage-listed sites, including:

 Agnes Banks, Rickards Avenue: Agnes Bank Natural Area
 Castlereagh, Castlereagh Road: Upper Castlereagh Public School
 Emu Plains, Main Western railway: Emu Plains railway station
 Londonderry, 947-953 Londonderry Road: Fossil and Petrology collections, New South Wales
 Mulgoa, Fairlight Road: Fairlight Homestead
 Mulgoa, Mulgoa Road: Fernhill, Mulgoa
 Mulgoa, 754-760 Mulgoa Road: Glenmore, Mulgoa
 Mulgoa, St Thomas Road: St Thomas' Anglican Church, Mulgoa
 Mulgoa, 2 St Thomas Road: Cox's Cottage
 Penrith, 34-40 Borec Road: Craithes House
 Penrith, 26 Coombes Drive: Torin Building
 Penrith, Great Western railway: Penrith railway station, Sydney
 Penrith, Nepean River, Great Western Highway: Victoria Bridge (Penrith)
 Penrith, Off Bruce Neale Dr, Steel Trusses 1.3 km past station: Emu Plains Underbridge
 Penrith, 1 Museum Drive: Penrith Museum of Fire, including the following:
 Fire and Rescue NSW Heritage Fleet
 NSW Fire Brigades No 10 Vehicle Number Plates
 1869 Shand Mason 7 inch Manual Fire Engine
 1891 Shand Mason Fire Engine
 1898 Shand Mason Curricle Ladders
 1909 Edward Smith Headquarters Switchboard
 1929 Ahrens Fox PS2 Fire Engine
 1939 Dennis Big 6 Fire Engine
 1942 Ford 21W Fire Brigade Mobile Canteen
 Regentville, 427 Mulgoa Road: Glenleigh Estate
 St Marys, Great Western Railway: St Marys railway station, Sydney
 St Marys, Mamre Road: Mamre, St Marys
 Werrington, Water Street: Rose Cottage and Early Slab Hut

References

External links
 Penrith City Council website

 
1871 establishments in Australia
 
Penrith